Jiuchong, also known as Danyang, is a town in the southeast of Xichuan County, southwestern Henan province, China.

Geography
Jiuchong town is situated at the Southeastern part of Xichuan County. The central route of South–North Water Transfer Project's canal head is located in the west of Jiuchong town.

Name
In year 1368, Zhu Yuanzhang attacked  the Yuan capital Dadu (present-day Beijing), and overthrowed the Yuan Dynasty. Some royal family of Yuan Dynasty fled here and establish a Nine heavy yard, Nine heavy yard in Chinese is Jiuchong Yuan. that is the origin of Jiuchong.

References

External links

Xichuan County
Towns in Nanyang, Henan